The National Institute of Economic and Industry Research (NIEIR), also known as National Economics, was founded in 1984 as a private economic research and consulting group serving clients in the public and private sectors.  NIEIR is based in Melbourne.

NIEIR prepares economic studies and forecasts in a range of areas including industry policy and strategy, regional economics and local government, energy policy and forecasting, international trade, employment and training, infrastructure and major events analysis.

External links 
National Institute of Economic and Industry Research website

Economic forecasting
Forecasting organizations